Edward Novitski (July 24, 1918 – June 29, 2006) was an American geneticist. He won a Guggenheim Fellowship in 1945, and 1974. The Edward Novitski Prize was named for him.

Life 
He was born in Wilkes-Barre. He experimented with Drosophila in high school.
He graduated from Purdue University, and California Institute of Technology.
He did research at the University of Rochester, University of Missouri an at Caltech. 
From 1951 to 1956, he taught at the University of Missouri.
He led the Drosophila genetics group at Oak Ridge National Laboratory. 
From 1958 to 1983, he taught at the University of Oregon.

Works 

 Sturtevant and Dobzhansky Two Scientists at Odds, 2005
 Human genetics, 1977
 The Genetics and biology of Drosophila, 1976

References 

1918 births
2006 deaths
American biologists
University of Oregon faculty
Purdue University alumni